The QJG-02, known by its export version as the Type CS/LM2, is a Chinese anti-aircraft heavy machine gun manufactured by Norinco for the People's Liberation Army. An updated variant the QJG-02G, also known as the Type CS/LM2A, was later also released.

Design and development
Type 02 heavy machine gun is China's replacement for Type 58, a direct copy of Soviet KPV heavy machine gun. Type 02 features an indigenous design, which is similar to Chinese W85 heavy machine gun. In 1990s, China began to develop new lightweight anti-aircraft gun, and the design was finalized in 2002. In 2004, China adopted the Type 02.

The weapon uses 14.5×114mm ammunition, and can be mounted on tripods and vehicles. The whole system, including its low-profile, single-gun mountings, weights . The rate of fire is 600 rounds per minute.

Variants
 QJG-02: original variant. 
 QJG-02G: improved variant. The new variant features a different tripod that fitted with small wheels, allowing the QJG02G to be towed by a light utility vehicle.

Users

Peshmerga

See also
 QJZ-89
 W85 heavy machine gun

References

Machine guns of the People's Republic of China
Heavy machine guns
14.5×114mm machine guns
Military equipment introduced in the 2000s